Tobias "Eggi" Exxel (born 27 February 1973) is the current bass player for the power metal band Edguy. Tobias was hired by Edguy in 1998 when vocalist Tobias Sammet, who had played bass since the band's formation in 1992, decided the band should have someone who could focus on playing the instrument full-time.

Tobias had previously played guitar and bass in the band Squealer and would also go on to perform both roles in his side-project, Taraxacum, which was active between 2000 and 2005. After Taraxacum was put to rest, Tobias formed Everleaf. Prior to these bands, he played in Galen from 1988 to 1993.

During Wacken Open Air on 7 August 2010, Tobias left the stage briefly to take a call relating to his new family. On 13 August 2010, Tobias' girlfriend gave birth to their first child, son Julian. Markus Grosskopf of Helloween replaced Tobias until his return. He has also played live with bands Gamma Ray and Unisonic as bass player and guitarist, respectively.

Discography

Edguy
 Theater of Salvation (1999)
 The Savage Poetry (2000)
 Mandrake (2001)
 Burning Down the Opera (2003)
 King of Fools (EP) (2004)
 Hellfire Club (2004)
 Superheroes (EP) (2005)
 Rocket Ride (2006)
 Tinnitus Sanctus (2008)
 Fucking with Fire – Live (2009)
 Age of the Joker (2011)
 Space Police: Defenders of the Crown (2014)

Squealer
 Wrong Time, Wrong Place? (1995)
 The Prophecy (1999)

Taraxacum
 Spirit of Freedom (2001)
 Rainmaker (2003)

Bassinvaders
 Hellbassbeaters (2008)

Krypteria
 All Beauty Must Die (2011)

References

External links
Official Edguy website

Living people
1973 births
German heavy metal bass guitarists
Male bass guitarists
Edguy members
21st-century bass guitarists
21st-century German male musicians
German male guitarists